The 1914 Australasian Championships was a tennis tournament that took place on outdoor Grass courts at the Warehouseman's Cricket Ground in Melbourne, Australia from 23 November to 28 November. It was the 10th edition of the Australasian Championships (now known as the Australian Open), the third held in Melbourne, and the third Grand Slam tournament of the year. The singles title was won by Australian Arthur O'Hara Wood.

Finals

Singles

 Arthur O'Hara Wood defeated  Gerald Patterson  6–4, 6–3, 5–7, 6–1

Doubles
 Ashley Campbell /  Gerald Patterson defeated  Rodney Heath /  Arthur O'Hara Wood 7–5, 3–6, 6–3, 6–3

References

External links
 Australian Open official Website

 
1914 in Australian tennis
1914
November 1914 sports events